Kosinowo may refer to the following places in Poland:
Kosinowo, Lower Silesian Voivodeship (south-west Poland)
Kosinowo, Kuyavian-Pomeranian Voivodeship (north-central Poland)
Kosinowo, Warmian-Masurian Voivodeship (north Poland)